The Cayman Islands competed in the Olympic Games for the first time at the 1976 Summer Olympics in Montreal, Quebec, Canada.

Previously Cayman Islands competed under Jamaica, British Empire as dependency until Jamaican independence in 1962. Cayman Islands also competed under West Indies Federation in 1960.

Results by event

Sailing
Mixed Two Person Dinghy
Gerry Kirkconnell and Peter Milburn

References
Official Olympic Reports
sports-reference

Nations at the 1976 Summer Olympics
1976
Olympics